The 20th Life OK Screen Awards was the 20th edition of the annual Screen Awards held to honor the best films of 2013 from the Hindi-language film industry (commonly known as Bollywood). The ceremony was held on 14 January 2014 hosted by actor Shahrukh Khan.

Goliyon Ki Raasleela Ram-Leela led the ceremony with 16 nominations, followed by Kai Po Che! with 13 nominations and Dhoom 3 with 12 nominations.

Goliyon Ki Raasleela Ram-Leela won 5 awards, including Best Actress (for Deepika Padukone), thus becoming the most-awarded film at the ceremony.

Awards 

The winners and nominees have been listed below. Winners are listed first, highlighted in boldface, and indicated with a double dagger.

Jury Awards

Technical Awards

Popular Choice Awards

Special awards

Superlatives

References

External links 
 The Screen Awards (2014) at the Internet Movie Database

Screen Awards